Chakrit Buathong (born September 8, 1985), is a Thai retired professional footballer who played as a winger.

Honours

International 
Thailand U-23
 Sea Games  Gold Medal (1); 2005

International career

In July, 2011 Chakrit was called up in a friendly match against Myanmar.

International

References

External links
 Profile at Goal

1985 births
Living people
Chakrit Buathong
Chakrit Buathong
Association football utility players
Chakrit Buathong
Chakrit Buathong
Chakrit Buathong
Chakrit Buathong
Chakrit Buathong
Chakrit Buathong
Chakrit Buathong
Southeast Asian Games medalists in football
Association football wingers
Competitors at the 2005 Southeast Asian Games